"Looking High, High, High" is a song by British singer Bryan Johnson, which represented the  at the Eurovision Song Contest 1960, performed in English.

The song was performed first on the night of the contest, held on 29 March 1960, preceding 's Siw Malmkvist with "Alla andra får varann". The song received 25 points, placing 2nd in a field of 13. That was Britain's equal highest Eurovision placing until the 1967 contest.

The song reached #20 on the UK Singles Chart and was succeeded as the UK representative at the 1961 contest by The Allisons with "Are You Sure?". Another British singer, David Hughes, also recorded the song around the same time.

References

Eurovision songs of the United Kingdom
Eurovision songs of 1960
Columbia Graphophone Company singles
1960 singles
1960 songs